Yasui Santetsu may refer to:

 Yasui Santetsu (Yasui house), go player and head of the Yasui house between 1612 and 1644
 Shibukawa Shunkai (1639–1715), Japanese astronomer and go player originally named Yasui Santetsu